Ypsonas (also spelled Ipsonas, Turkish: İpsona) is a municipality in the Limassol prefecture of Cyprus. It is one of the largest villages in the Limassol District of Cyprus and is located about 7 kilometers west of Limassol city. The southern part of the village is within the administrative borders of the British military base of Akrotiri - Episkopi.  It has 10,916 residents as recorded in the Census of 2011.

History and archaeology

Ypsonas has existed since the Middle Ages. Farmers from Lofou used to migrate seasonally to Ypsonas. Permanent settlement began during British rule. Today traces of churches built in the medieval time are to be seen related to the saint Agios Sylas.

Ypsonas Village is one of the biggest villages of Limassol city  and is situated about 7 km west of the said city. The southern part of it belongs to the British Forces Akrotiri and is managed by the British Police of Akrotiri.

The last decades Ypsonas is found with a variety of professional cultivations of fruit and vegetables such as for wine, orange range, carob, and lesser of other fruits. Other types of industrial productions include: processed meats, cheese industries, cement industries, manufacture of wooden furniture and packaging of agricultural products. It employs the fourth-largest employee personnel in the general area of Limassol city in Cyprus.

Many of its permanent residents work for tourism, trade, transports and services and many non-Cypriot laborers are seasonal workers in the agricultural part of Ypsonas.

It shows a rapid growth of permanent residents from only 3 residents in 1881 to 10.950 in 2011 census. It started in previous centuries with three only residents in 1881 and four residents in 1892. In 1901 they were 21. In 1021 they were 167. In 1931 the residents were 256 and in 1946 they were counted as 492. In 1960 the number of residents were  1496 and in 1973 they were 2043. In 1982 they were counted as 3061 and in 2011, 10.950 residents.

Although legend has it that Ypsonas was created by immigrants from another village in Cyprus starting with the first ever individual who made the move from Lofou to Ypsonas (Born 1887 in Lofou,), who allegedly initially was tending his lands in Ypsonas by going there by riding a donkey from Lofou in seasons,(page 698,) and later decided to live permanently on this area. (Lofou Village), things aren't quite so exact. The location was built and existed since Medieval Era as it has its name as 'Ipsonas' in medieval maps. In 1426 Mamlouks of Egypt invaded Cyprus and seized Limassol starting they invasion from Episkopi. This leads to the theory that Ypsonas as a settlement was destroyed during the Mamlouk invasion and later on again destroyed by the 1570 invasion to Cyprus of Turkish ships who attacked Limassol and reached Polemidia area nearby Ypsonas.

Today Ypsonas has an economic growth due to industries located in it and because the municipality further expanded and improved the roads quality and systems. It had become from a tiny village into a large municipality  with more than 10.000 residents, and all amenities (shops) that one can find in a large community,  7 km away from the city of Limassol west towards Paphos.

Ypsonas Municipality has decided to keep the original architecture of the remaining old homes in the old city part of the municipality, by not allowing the building of any elements that are not within the original character of the old village around Saint George church.

Archaeology for this area is found mainly in its medieval heritage, either the very old homes in the old part of the village where they retain even through renovations their original character. The medieval site of Agios Sylas is known as the main archaeological attraction of the municipality.

Part of the Ypsonas municipality belongs to the United Kingdom Sovereign Base Areas.
 This area has its own separate police (the British Forces in Cyprus Police) but the number used to call them is 112, the same as in the Republic of Cyprus and all countries in the European Union. The SBA of Akrotiri that expands to parts of Ypsonas is open to access to vehicles and humans without border control and it incorporates the villages: Ypsonas, Erimi, Akrotiri, Asomatos, Avdimou, Trachoni, Fasouri, Sotira, Tserkezoi, Pisouri, Kolosi, Episkopi and Paramali.

Religion

Ypsonas has three churches and three smaller chapels, for its predominantly Greek Orthodox community.

 ΙΕΡΟΣ ΝΑΟΣ ΑΓΙΟΥ ΣΑΒΒΑ (Holy Church of Agios Savvas), built in 2007 
 Ιερὸς Ναὸς Παναγίας Χρυσοπολιτίσσης (Holy Church of Saint Mary Chryssopolitissa), built around 1839
 Ιερὸς Ναὸς Ἁγίου Γεωργίου του Φτωχού  (Holy Church of Saint George The Poor), built in 1950s
 Άγιο Γεώργιο του Βικλιού (Chapel of Saint George Vikliou, a modern tiny chapel built by religious residents near Agios Sylas area)
  (Chapel of Saint Vichianos, built in 1969 based on legends of an older church built there with this name)
  (Chapel of Saint Raphael, built in 1995 in old Byzantine-style )

Politics and government

Mayors of Ypsonas :
  was mayor of Ypsonas from 2012-2016
 The current Mayor is

Education

Ypsonas has many elementary schools and 1 Gymnasium plus 1 continuing education school for adults 
 plus a continuating education school for adults according to the EU mandate for life-long learning

Transport

Ypsonas is served by local Limassol bus lines 17 and 16. In this way Ypsonas is connected to Limassol centre. Large avenue Elias Kannaourou and the main Cyprus highway connect Ypsonas to Limassol and other cities.

Topography
Ypsonas is built at an altitude of 90 meters. The village area has an inclination from north to south. The altitude decreases from 479 in north to 90 in the village level and to 20 towards southern parts.

Climate

Ypsonas has an annual rainfall of 440 cm. The open cultivated fields of Ypsonas Industrial area do not have any tall buildings and thus the temperature in summer can be higher than within the shaded (due to buildings) city of Limassol. Ypsonas also may have more wind than Limassol city for the same reason.

Economy
The Industrial Area of Ypsonas has many cultivated fields which produce ready-made grass, vines, citrus fruits, almonds, olives, carobs, and milk from goat herds.

In the same area, large cement factories operate, as well as much used car-parts processing.

Ypsonas has a blooming industry development. The number of people that work in industries in this area are the fourth-largest in Limassol. The main industrial factories are charcuteries, cheese and cured meat factories, saw factories, boat manufacturing factories, and wooden furniture factories as well as product and packing of fruit and vegetable products. There are since 2000s more restaurants of internationally known fast foods chains, like KFC, Costa Cafe and more and supermarkets like LIDL, Papantoniou, Pop Life.

Demographics
The population of Ypsonas has increased steadily since the late 19th century.

Sports
Ypsonas has gyms, soccer stadiums and teams such as Digenis FC, tennis academy Ioannides and Krasava eny Ypsonas.

References

External links
 Ypsonas Municipality official website
 Municipality map
 The SBA Administration (where parts of Ypsonas are administered by) 

Municipalities in Limassol District